Ewanrigg is a suburb of the town of Maryport, Cumbria, England, historically within Cumberland. Ewanrigg is a residential area and has a post office, a school and a few places of worship.


Location 

Governance
Ewanrigg is in the parliamentary constituency of Workington, Mark Jenkinson is the Member of parliament.

For Local Government purposes it is in the Maryport North Ward of Allerdale Borough Council and the Maryport North Ward of Cumbria County Council.

Ewanrigg does not have its own Parish Council, instead it is part of Maryport Town Council.

Transport 
For transport there is the A594 road going through the settlement and the A596 road nearby; Maryport railway station is also nearby. Other suburbs of Maryport include Ellenborough, Netherton and Glasson.

References

External links
Cumbria County History Trust: Ellenborough and Ewanrigg (nb: provisional research only – see Talk page)

Populated places in Cumbria
Maryport